Andreas Mattheis (born May 24, 1954 in Petrópolis, Rio de Janeiro) is a Brazilian retired automobile racing driver.

Personal life 
Mattheis is father of, racing driver Rodolpho Mattheis, TV presenter Fiorella Mattheis, Alexandre Mattheis, and, columnist Aline Mattheis.

Racing career

Driving career 
He won for four times in Campeonato Brasileiro de Marcas e Pilotos and twice in the GT3 Brasil Championship.

Team career 
Mattheis is owner of three teams, in Stock Car Brasil:
 WA Mattheis-Red Bull (Red Bull Racing Brasil), Red Bull branded in 2007; est. 2007
 A.Mattheis-Shell; est. 1995.
 R. Mattheis Motorsport-Red Bull (Red Bull Racing Mattheis); est. 2013. Mattheis formed this team with his son Rodolpho.
His teams have won the title in 2005, 2008, 2009, 2011, 2012.

References 

1954 births
Living people
Sportspeople from Rio de Janeiro (city)
Brazilian racing drivers
European Le Mans Series drivers
Brazilian people of German descent